Sheffield-Sheffield Lake City Schools is a school district, whose board office is located in Sheffield, Ohio, 20 miles west of Cleveland, Ohio. It is a public school located in northeastern Ohio.

Schools
Forestlawn Early Learning Center (Pre-K & K)
Knollwood Elementary School (K-2)
Brookside Intermediate School(3-6)
Brookside Middle School (7-8)
Brookside High School (9-12)

External links
District Website

Education in Lorain County, Ohio
School districts in Ohio